Harold Stuart Stone (born August 10, 1938 in St. Louis, Missouri) is an American computer scientist specializing in parallel computer architecture. He is an IEEE Fellow, and a Fellow of the Association for Computing Machinery (1993).

Education and career
Stone obtained a bachelor in Electrical Engineering at Princeton University in 1960, and his masters and PhD in 1961 and 1963 at the University of California, Berkeley. His PhD advisors were Robert B. Ash and Eugene Wong. He was a faculty member at Stanford University from 1968 until 1974, when he moved to the University of Massachusetts Amherst. From 1984 onwards was he a researcher at IBM's Thomas J. Watson Research Center and later as a NEC Fellow at the NEC Research Institute in Princeton, New Jersey.

Books 
Stone's books include:
 High Performance Computer Architecture, Addison-Wesley 1987, 2. Edition 1993
 Introduction to Computer Architecture, 1975, 2. Edition, Chicago: Science Research Associates 1980
 Introduction to Computer Organization and Data Structures, McGraw Hill 1971
 Discrete mathematical structures and their applications, Chicago: Science Research Associates 1973
 Microcomputer Interfacing, Addison-Wesley 1982
 with Daniel Siewiorek Introduction to computer organization and data structures, PDP-11 edition, McGraw Hill 1975

Recognition
Stone received the IEEE Emanuel R. Piore Award in 1992, the Taylor L. Booth Award in 1999, and the Charles Babbage Award in 1991. He is IEEE Fellow and Fellow of the Association for Computing Machinery (1993).

References 

1938 births
Living people
American computer scientists
Princeton University alumni
University of California, Berkeley alumni
Fellow Members of the IEEE
People from St. Louis